Francesco Mondada (born 17 March 1967) is a Swiss professor in artificial intelligence and robotics. He got a Master's degree in Microengineering at the EPFL in 1991 and a PhD degree in 1997. He is one of the creators of the Khepera and directed the design of the S-bot, the e-puck, the marXbot and the Thymio mobile robots. Together, these robots are mentioned in more than 9000 research articles. In particular the Khepera robot is a milestone in the field of bio-inspired and evolutionary robotics.

He was one of the founders and director of K-team SA from its creation 1995 to 2000, and one of the founders of Calerga Sarl in 2001 and Mobsya in 2010.

His recent work concerns collective robotics and education.

Awards and honours 
 University Latsis
 Credit Suisse Award for Best Teaching.
 2012 Polysphère, award for the best professor from the School of Engineering at EPFL given by the students.
 Member of the Swiss Academy of Technical Sciences (SATW) 
 Several best poster/paper/demo awards, for instance the Best Paper Award Design at the HRI 2017 conference.

Selected publications

 F. Mondada, M. Bonanim, F. Riedo, M. Briod, L. Pereyre, P. Retornaz, Stephane Magnenat. Bringing Robotics to Formal Education: The Thymio Open-Source Hardware Robot. IEEE Robotics & Automation Magazine, vol. 24, no. 1, pp. 77–85, March 2017. 
 J. Halloy, G. Sempo, G. Caprari, C. Rivault, M. Asadpour, F. Tache, I. Said, V. Durier, S. Canonge, J. Ame, C. Detrain, N. Correll, A. Martinoli, F. Mondada, R. Siegwart, and J.-L. Deneubourg. Social Integration of Robots into Groups of Cockroaches to Control Self-Organized Choices. Science, 318(5853):1155-1158, 2007. 

 F. Mondada, G. C. Pettinaro, A. Guignard, I. Kwee, D. Floreano, J.-L. Deneubourg, S. Nolfi, L. Gambardella, and M. Dorigo. SWARM-BOT: a New Distributed Robotic Concept. Autonomous Robots, special Issue on Swarm Robotics, 17(2-3):193-221, 2004. September - November 2004 Sponsor: swarm-bots, OFES 01-0012-1. 
 D. Floreano and F. Mondada. Evolution of Homing Navigation in a Real Mobile Robot. IEEE Transactions on Systems, Man and Cybernetics Part B : Cybernetics, 26(3):396-407, 1996. 
 F. Mondada, E. Franzi, P. Ienne, T. Yoshikawa, and F. Miyazaki. Mobile Robot Miniaturization: A Tool for Investigation in Control Algorithms. In Experimental Robotics III, volume 200 of Lecture Notes in Control and Information Sciences, pages 501-13. Springer, London, 1994.

References

External links
 Professional homepage with a list of publications (Google scholar)
 Mobots group homepage of the research group of F. Mondada
 Personal homepage

1967 births
Living people
Swiss roboticists